Neeli Chatri Waale is an Indian television program produced by Ashwni Dhir and broadcast on Zee TV. The Show is based on a Tamil story Kadavulum Kandhasami Pillaiyum by Pudhumaipithan.

Plot
The series follows a common man named Bhagwan Das who is torn between his personal and professional life. He is bullied by his boss, wife, and father, and his children are ashamed of his profession as an underwear salesman.  Bhagwan Das meets Shivaye, a human representation of the Hindu god Shiva. Shivaye, whom only Bhagwan Das can see, guides Bhagwan Das through various dilemmas.

Cast

Chaubey Family
 Yashpal Sharma/Rajesh Kumar as Bhagwan Das Chaubey - Aatmaram's son, Bobby's husband, Babli and Babloo's father, Gowardhan's brother in law.(2014 - 2015/2015- 2016)
 Disha Savla as Bobby Chaubey - Baby's sister,Bhagwan Das's wife, Aatmaram's daughter in law, Babli and Babloo's mother, Gowardhan's sister in law.(2014-2016)
 Himanshu Soni as Shivaye - Bhagwan Das's friend, Parvati's husband(2014-2016)
 Mithilesh Chaturvedi as Aatmaram Chaubey - Bhagwan Das's father, Bobby's father in law, Babli and Babloo's grandfather.(2014-2016)
 Aayan Khan as Babloo Chaubey - Bhagwan Das and Bobby's son, Babli's younger brother, Aatmaram's grandson, Gowardhan's nephew.(2014-2016)
 Prerna Gautam as Babli Chaubey - Bhagwan Das and Bobby's daughter, Babloo's elder sister, Aatmaram's granddaughter.(2014-2016)
 Sanjay Chaudhary as Batuk Laal
 Anup Upadhyay as SI Gowardhan Dubey - Baby's husband,Bhagwan Das's brother in law, Babli and Babloo's uncle.(2014-2016)
 Melissa Pais as Baby Dubey - Bobby's elder sister, Gowardhan's wife, Bhagwan Das 's sister in law, Babli and Babloo's aunt.(2014-2016)
 Shahbaz Khan as Mahadev Singh
 Salim Zaidi as Mishra Ji
Nivedita Tiwari /Mansi Srivastava as Goddess Parvati      
Soma Rathod as Mishrain (neighbour)/Premlata - Mishrain's mother (2014-2016)
Tarun Khanna as Rocky (wrestler)
 Ishteyak Arif Khan as Mirza Ji
 Cinderella Dcruz as Babloo's Teacher
 Kundan Kumar as Mithailal
Bikramjeet Kanwarpal as Kaalia: Bhagwan Das's boss.
 Ami Trivedi as Lakshmi - Ep 61
 Rajeev Mehta as Gajju - Ep 105
 Samiksha Bhatnagar as Shaili (Ep.30) and Inspector Shakti Sharma from Episode 58

References

External links

Zee TV original programming
2014 Indian television series debuts
Hindi-language television shows
2016 Indian television series endings
Hindu mythology in popular culture
Television shows based on Tamil-language novels